The W. J. Voit Memorial Trophy was awarded by the Helms Athletic Foundation from 1951 to 1978 to the outstanding college football player on the Pacific Coast.  The recipient was determined based on votes cast by West Coast football writers and later broadcasters as well.  Award recipients include College Football Hall of Fame inductees, O. J. Simpson, Mike Garrett, Jim Plunkett, Joe Kapp, Craig Morton, Billy Kilmer, and Anthony Davis.

History
The trophy was named after German American entrepreneur William J. Voit (1881–1946), the founder of the W.J. Voit Rubber Company.  Voit was one of the oldest sporting goods companies in the world.  Founded in 1922, the company developed and patented the first full-molded, all-rubber inflatable ball and the first needle-type air retention valves in the late 1920s.  Voit became a leading manufacturer of footballs and basketballs.  In the 1950s and 1960s, a representative of the Voit organization presented the Voit Trophy at a banquet preceding the Rose Bowl game.  In 1969, a Los Angeles Times columnist wrote the following about the Voit Trophy tradition:"Jim Plunkett was in Pasadena Monday to receive the 19th Annual Voit Memorial Trophy, which goes to the Pacific Coast's top player.  The trophy stands nearly as high as most men who receive it, but Plunkett dwarfed the thing. ... The Voit Trophy, though, is an accurate mirror of later success in professional ball.  Three of the NFL's top quarterbacks -- Joe Kapp, Billy Kilmer and Craig Morton -- all won it, as did such other pro players as Mike Garrett, Gary Beban and O. J. Simpson. Since the award was instituted in 1951, only one winner has failed to play pro ball of some sort."

In addition to the notable NFL players to win the Voit Trophy, the runners-up in the Voit voting included such Hall of Fame players as John Brodie (Voit runner-up in 1956) and Mel Renfro (Voit runner-up in 1963), and Hugh McElhenny (Voit runner-up in 1951).

Unlike the Pop Warner Trophy, awarded each year to the top senior football player on the West Coast, the Voit Trophy was open to underclassmen.  Accordingly, four players received the Voit Trophy in multiple years.  The multi-year winners of the award are USC Trojans running back Jon Arnett (1955 and 1956), Stanford Cardinal quarterback Jim Plunkett (1969 and 1970), and USC tailback Anthony Davis (1972 and 1974).

USC and Stanford athletes won the Voit Trophy more than those at any other school, with USC athletes taking the trophy nine times and Stanford athletes doing so six times.

In 1975, the Pac-10 Conference began awarding its own Player of the Year Awards for offense and defense.  After the 1978 season, the Voit Trophy was discontinued.

Recipients
Recipients of the Voit Trophy are as follows:

See also
Pop Warner Trophy

References

College football regional and state awards
Sports in the Western United States